Leif Thorsson, born July 3, 1945 in Malmö, Sweden is a Swedish jurist specialized in corporate law and Justice of the Supreme Court of Sweden 1993-2012. Education: law degree (Jur. kand.). Leif Thorsson is also the recipient of an honorary doctorate degree in law from Stockholm University. 

He was, in addition to his position at the Supreme Court, also the president of the Arbitration Institute of the Stockholm Chamber of Commerce (Stockholms Handelskammares Skiljedomsinstitut), which he has been a member of since 1989, and vice chairman of the Stock Market Panel ("Aktiemarknadsnämnden"). Thorsson is also a member of the board in several non-profit foundations. Before being appointed to the Supreme Court Thorsson was an associate at the Lagerlöf law firm between 1974-1978. After having been admitted to the bar association Thorsson was hired as an attorney at Carl Swartling law firm in Stockholm, where he made partner in 1983.

In 2005, Thorsson admitted that he had violated the Sex Purchase Act. He was on leave from the Supreme Court for a period but was protected by Göran Lambertz, the then Chancellor of Justice, who in May the same year decided against asking the Supreme Court for the removal of Thorsson.

Bibliography 

Festskrift till Gotthard Calissendorff, editors: Leif Thorsson and Sven Unger, Stockholm, 1990.
Till Gunnar Nord: ett symposium, editors: Stephan Carlsson and Leif Thorsson, Stockholm, 1996.
Skog, Rolf: Tvångsinlösen av minoritetsaktier – kommer den nya aktiebolagslagen att lösa problemen?, article by Leif Thorsson: Förutsättningarna för tvångsinlösen, Del I. Stockholm, 2003.

Living people
1945 births
Stockholm University alumni
People from Malmö
Justices of the Supreme Court of Sweden
20th-century Swedish judges
21st-century Swedish judges